Tales from the Shadowhunter Academy or simply called Shadowhunter Academy is a series of connected novellas featuring the character of Simon Lewis from Cassandra Clare's bestselling The Mortal Instruments series.  It consists of 10 e-novellas written by Cassandra Clare in collaboration with other authors that were published on a monthly basis. Much like The Bane Chronicles, Tales from the Shadowhunter Academy was released in print on November 15, 2016.

Novellas 
 Welcome to Shadowhunter Academy (with Sarah Rees Brennan)
 Release Date: February 17, 2015
 Narrator: Devon Bostick
 The Lost Herondale (with Robin Wasserman)
 Release Date: March 17, 2015
 Narrator: Jack Falahee
 The Whitechapel Fiend (with Maureen Johnson)
 Release Date: April 21, 2015
 Narrator: Luke Pasqualino
 Nothing but Shadows (with Sarah Rees Brennan)
 Release Date: May 19, 2015
 Narrator: Nico Mirallegro
 The Evil We Love (with Robin Wasserman)
 Release Date: June 16, 2015
 Narrator: Chris Wood
 Pale Kings and Princes (with Robin Wasserman)
 Release Date: July 21, 2015
 Narrator: Ki Hong Lee
 Bitter of Tongue (with Sarah Rees Brennan)
 Release Date: August 18, 2015
 Narrator: Torrance Coombs
 The Fiery Trial (with Maureen Johnson)
 Release Date: September 15, 2015
 Narrator: Sam Heughan
 Born to Endless Night (with Sarah Rees Brennan)
 Release Date: October 20, 2015
 Narrator: Keahu Kahuanui
 Angels Twice Descending (with Robin Wasserman)
 Release Date: November 17, 2015
 Narrator: Brett Dalton

Plot 

Simon Lewis, who has been a mundane in City of Bones, then a vampire from the middle of City of Ashes till almost the end of City of Heavenly Fire has been stripped of his memories by a Greater Demon in the final volume of The Mortal Instruments. He isn't sure who he is anymore and therefore, in order to retrieve his memories, he makes a decision of becoming a Shadowhunter. To become a Shadowhunter, he must first train like a Shadowhunter and he visits the Shadowhunter Academy in order to retrieve his memories.

This book contains characters not only from The Mortal Instruments but also from The Infernal Devices and reveals much of the unknown history of some famous shadowhunters like Michael Wayland, Stephen Herondale and Robert Lightwood. Simon learns about the history of Shadowhunters through guest lecturers like Jace Herondale, Tessa Gray, Catarina Loss etc.

References

External links
 http://www.ew.com/article/2014/10/15/cassandra-clare-tales-from-the-shadowhunter-academy
 http://www.simonandschuster.com/series/Tales-from-the-Shadowhunter-Academy
 http://www.cassandraclare.com/my-writing/novels/tales-from-the-shadowhunter-academy/
 http://shadowhunters.com/shadowhunters-novels/tales-from-the-shadowhunter-academy/
 http://books.simonandschuster.com/Tales-from-the-Shadowhunter-Academy/Cassandra-Clare/Tales-from-the-Shadowhunter-Academy/9781481443258

American young adult novels
2010s fantasy novels